In heraldry, a mantle is a symbol of sovereign power and is generally reserved for royalty. In some cases, its use has also been granted to other nobles, in recognition of particular merits. In ordinary rendering, the mantle is usually crimson and lined with ermine.

Certain coats of arms may also display a pavilion (similar to a baldachin) surmounting the mantle. The pavilion is said to be the invention of the Frenchman Philip Moreau.

While common in continental European heraldry, the mantle and pavilion is absent in English and Scottish heraldry.

Mantle and pavilion should not be mixed with Mantling.

Gallery

Mantles

Royal mantles

Non-royal mantles

Mantles of chivalric orders

Mantles with pavilions

See also

 Robe

References

External devices in achievements